Mystomemia is a monotypic moth genus of the family Erebidae. Its only species, Mystomemia hortealis, is found in Mexico. Both the genus and the species were first described by Harrison Gray Dyar Jr. in 1919.

References

Hypeninae
Monotypic moth genera